Bronze is an alloy consisting primarily of copper, commonly with about 12–12.5% tin and often with the addition of other metals (including aluminium, manganese, nickel, or zinc) and sometimes non-metals, such as phosphorus, or metalloids such as arsenic or silicon. These additions produce a range of alloys that may be harder than copper alone, or have other useful properties, such as strength, ductility, or machinability.

The archaeological period in which bronze was the hardest metal in widespread use is known as the Bronze Age. The beginning of the Bronze Age in western Eurasia and India is conventionally dated to the mid-4th millennium BCE (~3500 BCE), and to the early 2nd millennium BCE in China; elsewhere it gradually spread across regions. The Bronze Age was followed by the Iron Age starting from about 1300 BCE and reaching most of Eurasia by about 500 BCE, although bronze continued to be much more widely used than it is in modern times.

Because historical artworks were often made of brasses (copper and zinc) and bronzes with different compositions, modern museum and scholarly descriptions of older artworks increasingly use the generalized term "copper alloy" instead.

Etymology

The word bronze (1730–1740) is borrowed from Middle French  (1511), itself borrowed from Italian  'bell metal, brass' (13th century, transcribed in Medieval Latin as ) from either:

 in its earliest form from Old Persian ,  ('brass', modern ) and  'copper', from which also came Georgian , Turkish pirinç, and Armenian , also meaning 'bronze'.

History

The discovery of bronze enabled people to create metal objects that were harder and more durable than previously possible. Bronze tools, weapons, armor, and building materials such as decorative tiles were harder and more durable than their stone and copper ("Chalcolithic") predecessors. Initially, bronze was made out of copper and arsenic, forming arsenic bronze, or from naturally or artificially mixed ores of copper and arsenic. 

The earliest artifacts so far known come from the Iranian plateau, in the 5th millennium BCE, and are smelted from native arsenical copper and copper-arsenides, such as algodonite and domeykite.  The earliest tin-copper-alloy artifact has been dated to c. 4650 BCE, in a Vinča culture site in Pločnik (Serbia), and believed to have been smelted from a natural tin-copper ore, stannite. Other early examples date to the late 4th millennium BCE in Egypt, Susa (Iran) and some ancient sites in China, Luristan (Iran), Tepe Sialk (Iran), Mundigak (Afghanistan), and Mesopotamia (Iraq).

Tin bronze was superior to arsenic bronze in that the alloying process could be more easily controlled, and the resulting alloy was stronger and easier to cast. Also, unlike arsenic, metallic tin and fumes from tin refining are not toxic. 

Tin became the major non-copper ingredient of bronze in the late 3rd millennium BCE.

Ores of copper and the far rarer tin are not often found together (exceptions include Cornwall in the United Kingdom, one ancient site in Thailand and one in Iran), so serious bronze work has always involved trade. Tin sources and trade in ancient times had a major influence on the development of cultures. In Europe, a major source of tin was the British deposits of ore in Cornwall, which were traded as far as Phoenicia in the eastern Mediterranean.

In many parts of the world, large hoards of bronze artifacts are found, suggesting that bronze also represented a store of value and an indicator of social status. In Europe, large hoards of bronze tools, typically socketed axes (illustrated above), are found, which mostly show no signs of wear. With Chinese ritual bronzes, which are documented in the inscriptions they carry and from other sources, the case is clear. These were made in enormous quantities for elite burials, and also used by the living for ritual offerings.

Transition to iron
Though bronze is generally harder than wrought iron, with Vickers hardness of 60–258 vs. 30–80, the Bronze Age gave way to the Iron Age after a serious disruption of the tin trade: the population migrations of around 1200–1100 BCE reduced the shipping of tin around the Mediterranean and from Britain, limiting supplies and raising prices. As the art of working in iron improved, iron became cheaper and improved in quality. As cultures advanced from hand-wrought iron to machine-forged iron (typically made with trip hammers powered by water), blacksmiths learned how to make steel. Steel is stronger than bronze and holds a sharper edge longer.

Bronze was still used during the Iron Age, and has continued in use for many purposes to the modern day.

Composition

There are many different bronze alloys, but typically modern bronze is 88% copper and 12% tin. Alpha bronze consists of the alpha solid solution of tin in copper. Alpha bronze alloys of 4–5% tin are used to make coins, springs, turbines and blades. Historical "bronzes" are highly variable in composition, as most metalworkers probably used whatever scrap was on hand; the metal of the 12th-century English Gloucester Candlestick is bronze containing a mixture of copper, zinc, tin, lead, nickel, iron, antimony, arsenic and an unusually large amount of silver – between 22.5% in the base and 5.76% in the pan below the candle. The proportions of this mixture suggest that the candlestick was made from a hoard of old coins. The 13th-century Benin Bronzes are in fact brass, and the 12th-century Romanesque Baptismal font at St Bartholomew's Church, Liège is described as both bronze and brass.

In the Bronze Age, two forms of bronze were commonly used: "classic bronze", about 10% tin, was used in casting; and "mild bronze", about 6% tin, was hammered from ingots to make sheets. Bladed weapons were mostly cast from classic bronze, while helmets and armor were hammered from mild bronze.

Commercial bronze (90% copper and 10% zinc) and architectural bronze (57% copper, 3% lead, 40% zinc) are more properly regarded as brass alloys because they contain zinc as the main alloying ingredient. They are commonly used in architectural applications.

Plastic bronze contains a significant quantity of lead, which makes for improved plasticity possibly used by the ancient Greeks in their ship construction.

 has a composition of Si: 2.80–3.80%, Mn: 0.50–1.30%, Fe: 0.80% max., Zn: 1.50% max., Pb: 0.05% max., Cu: balance.

Other bronze alloys include aluminium bronze, phosphor bronze, manganese bronze, bell metal, arsenical bronze, speculum metal, bismuth bronze, and cymbal alloys.

Properties
Bronzes are typically ductile alloys, considerably less brittle than cast iron. Typically bronze oxidizes only superficially; once a copper oxide (eventually becoming copper carbonate) layer is formed, the underlying metal is protected from further corrosion. This can be seen on statues from the Hellenistic period. However, if copper chlorides are formed, a corrosion-mode called "bronze disease" will eventually completely destroy it. Copper-based alloys have lower melting points than steel or iron and are more readily produced from their constituent metals. They are generally about 10 percent denser than steel, although alloys using aluminum or silicon may be slightly less dense. Bronze is a better conductor of heat and electricity than most steels. The cost of copper-base alloys is generally higher than that of steels but lower than that of nickel-base alloys.

Copper and its alloys have a huge variety of uses that reflect their versatile physical, mechanical, and chemical properties. Some common examples are the high electrical conductivity of pure copper, low-friction properties of bearing bronze (bronze that has a high lead content— 6–8%), resonant qualities of bell bronze (20% tin, 80% copper), and resistance to corrosion by seawater of several bronze alloys.

Bronze is usually nonmagnetic, but certain alloys containing iron or nickel may have magnetic properties.

Uses

Bronze, or bronze-like alloys and mixtures, were used for coins over a longer period. Bronze was especially suitable for use in boat and ship fittings prior to the wide employment of stainless steel owing to its combination of toughness and resistance to salt water corrosion. Bronze is still commonly used in ship propellers and submerged bearings.

In the 20th century, silicon was introduced as the primary alloying element, creating an alloy with wide application in industry and the major form used in contemporary statuary. Sculptors may prefer silicon bronze because of the ready availability of silicon bronze brazing rod, which allows color-matched repair of defects in castings. Aluminum is also used for the structural metal aluminum bronze.

Bronze parts are tough and typically used for bearings, clips, electrical connectors and springs.

Bronze also has low friction against dissimilar metals, making it important for cannons prior to modern tolerancing, where iron cannonballs would otherwise stick in the barrel. It is still widely used today for springs, bearings, bushings, automobile transmission pilot bearings, and similar fittings, and is particularly common in the bearings of small electric motors. Phosphor bronze is particularly suited to precision-grade bearings and springs. It is also used in guitar and piano strings.

Unlike steel, bronze struck against a hard surface will not generate sparks, so it (along with beryllium copper) is used to make hammers, mallets, wrenches and other durable tools to be used in explosive atmospheres or in the presence of flammable vapors. Bronze is used to make bronze wool for woodworking applications where steel wool would discolor oak.

Phosphor bronze is used for ships' propellers, musical instruments, and electrical contacts. Bearings are often made of bronze for its friction properties. It can be impregnated with oil to make the proprietary Oilite and similar material for bearings. Aluminum bronze is hard and wear-resistant, and is used for bearings and machine tool ways.

Sculptures

Bronze is widely used for casting bronze sculptures. Common bronze alloys have the unusual and desirable property of expanding slightly just before they set, thus filling the finest details of a mould. Then, as the bronze cools, it shrinks a little, making it easier to separate from the mould.

The Assyrian king Sennacherib (704–681 BCE) claims to have been the first to cast monumental bronze statues (of up to 30 tonnes) using two-part moulds instead of the lost-wax method.

Bronze statues were regarded as the highest form of sculpture in Ancient Greek art, though survivals are few, as bronze was a valuable material in short supply in the Late Antique and medieval periods. Many of the most famous Greek bronze sculptures are known through Roman copies in marble, which were more likely to survive.

In India, bronze sculptures from the Kushana (Chausa hoard) and Gupta periods (Brahma from Mirpur-Khas, Akota Hoard, Sultanganj Buddha) and later periods (Hansi Hoard) have been found. Indian Hindu artisans from the period of the Chola empire in Tamil Nadu used bronze to create intricate statues via the lost-wax casting method with ornate detailing depicting the deities of Hinduism. The art form survives to this day, with many silpis, craftsmen, working in the areas of Swamimalai and Chennai.

In antiquity other cultures also produced works of high art using bronze. For example: in Africa, the bronze heads of the Kingdom of Benin; in Europe, Grecian bronzes typically of figures from Greek mythology; in east Asia, Chinese ritual bronzes of the Shang and Zhou dynasty—more often ceremonial vessels but including some figurine examples. 

Bronze continues into modern times as one of the materials of choice for monumental statuary.

Mirrors

Before it became possible to produce glass with acceptably flat surfaces, bronze was a standard material for mirrors.  Bronze was used for this purpose in many parts of the world, probably based on independent discoveries.

Bronze mirrors survive from the Egyptian Middle Kingdom (2040–1750 BCE), and China from at least c. 550 BCE. In Europe, the Etruscans were making bronze mirrors in the sixth century BCE, and Greek and Roman mirrors followed the same pattern. Although other materials such as speculum metal had come into use, and Western glass mirrors had largely taken over, bronze mirrors were still being made in Japan and elsewhere in the eighteenth century, and are still made on a small scale in Kerala, India.

Musical instruments

Bronze is the preferred metal for bells in the form of a high tin bronze alloy known as bell metal, which is typically about 23% tin.

Nearly all professional cymbals are made from bronze, which gives a desirable balance of durability and timbre. Several types of bronze are used, commonly B20 bronze, which is roughly 20% tin, 80% copper, with traces of silver, or the tougher B8 bronze made from 8% tin and 92% copper. As the tin content in a bell or cymbal rises, the timbre drops.

Bronze is also used for the windings of steel and nylon strings of various stringed instruments such as the double bass, piano, harpsichord, and guitar. Bronze strings are commonly reserved on pianoforte for the lower pitch tones, as they possess a superior sustain quality to that of high-tensile steel.

Bronzes of various metallurgical properties are widely used in struck idiophones around the world, notably bells, singing bowls, gongs, cymbals, and other idiophones from Asia. Examples include Tibetan singing bowls, temple bells of many sizes and shapes, Javanese gamelan, and other bronze musical instruments. The earliest bronze archeological finds in Indonesia date from 1–2 BCE, including flat plates probably suspended and struck by a wooden or bone mallet. Ancient bronze drums from Thailand and Vietnam date back 2,000 years. Bronze bells from Thailand and Cambodia date back to 3600 BCE.

Some companies are now making saxophones from phosphor bronze (3.5 to 10% tin and up to 1% phosphorus content). Bell bronze/B20 is used to make the tone rings of many professional model banjos. The tone ring is a heavy (usually ) folded or arched metal ring attached to a thick wood rim, over which a skin, or most often, a plastic membrane (or head) is stretched – it is the bell bronze that gives the banjo a crisp powerful lower register and clear bell-like treble register.

Biblical references
There are over 125 references to bronze (‘nehoshet’), which appears to be the Hebrew word used for copper and any of its alloys.  However, the Old Testament era Hebrews are not thought to have had the capability to manufacture zinc (needed to make brass) and so it is likely that 'nehoshet’ refers to copper and its alloys with tin, now called bronze.  In the King James Version, there is no use of the word 'bronze' and ‘nehoshet’ was translated as 'brass'.  Modern translations use 'bronze'.   Bronze (nehoshet) was used widely in the Tabernacle for items such as the bronze altar (Exodus Ch.27), bronze laver (Exodus Ch.30), utensils, and mirror (Exodus Ch.38). It was mentioned in the account of Moses holding up a bronze snake on a pole in Numbers Ch.21. In First Kings, it is mentioned that Hiram was very skilled in working with bronze, and he made many furnishings for Solomon's Temple including pillars, capitals, stands, wheels, bowls, and plates, some of which were highly decorative (see I Kings 7:13-47). Bronze was also widely used as battle armor and helmet, as in the battle of David and Goliath in I Samuel 17:5-6;38 (also see II Chron. 12:10).

Coins and medals

Bronze has also been used in coins; most "copper" coins are actually bronze, with about 4 percent tin and 1 percent zinc.

As with coins, bronze has been used in the manufacture of various types of medals for centuries, and "bronze medals" are known in contemporary times for being awarded for third place in sporting competitions and other events. The term is now often used for third place even when no actual bronze medal is awarded. The usage  in part arose from the trio of gold, silver and bronze to represent the first three Ages of Man in Greek mythology: the Golden Age, when men lived among the gods; the Silver age, where youth lasted a hundred years; and the Bronze Age, the era of heroes. It was first adopted for a sports event at the 1904 Summer Olympics. At the 1896 event, silver was awarded to winners and bronze to runners-up, while at 1900 other prizes were given rather than medals.

Bronze is the normal material for the related form of the plaquette, normally a rectangular work of art with a scene in relief, for a collectors' market.

See also

References

External links

 
 Bronze bells
 "Lost Wax, Found Bronze": lost-wax casting explained
 
 Viking Bronze – Ancient and Early Medieval bronze casting

 
Copper alloys
Tin alloys